Okolie is a Nigerian surname that may refer to the following people:
Chidera Okolie (born 1993), Nigerian writer 
Chris Okolie (died 2007), Nigerian concert promoter and publisher
Karin Okolie (born 1994), Bulgarian sprinter
Kenneth Okolie (born 1984), Nigerian actor and model 
Lawrence Okolie (born 1992), British boxer
Odafa Onyeka Okolie (born 1985), Nigerian football player